Rulyrana susatamai is a species of frog in the family Centrolenidae. It is endemic to the eastern flank of the Cordillera Central, Colombia, in the departments of Antioquia, Caldas, Huila, and Tolima.

Habitat and conservation
The eggs are laid on leaves overhanging the stream, to which the tadpoles drop upon hatching.

Rulyrana susatamai is a common species. However, it requires gallery forest and is sensitive to habitat disturbance. It is threatened by habitat loss and fragmentation.

References

susatamai
Amphibians of Colombia
Amphibians of the Andes
Endemic fauna of Colombia
Amphibians described in 1995
Taxa named by John Douglas Lynch
Taxonomy articles created by Polbot